Tit-e Olya (also Romanized as Tīt-e ‘Olyā; also known as Tīt-e Bālā) is a village in Alan Rural District, in the Central District of Sardasht County, West Azerbaijan Province, Iran. At the 2006 census, its population was 70, in 13 families.

References 

Populated places in Sardasht County